Amphicyclotulus schrammi is a species of tropical land snail with a gill and an operculum, a terrestrial gastropod mollusk in the family Neocyclotidae.

Distribution
Guadeloupe

References

Neocyclotidae